N'Ko is a script devised by Solomana Kante in 1949, as a modern writing system for the Mandé languages of West Africa. The term N'Ko, which means I say in all Mandé languages, is also used for the Mandé literary standard written in N'Ko script.

The script has a few similarities to the Arabic script, notably its direction (right-to-left) and the letters which are connected at the base. Unlike Arabic, it is obligatory to mark both tone and vowels. N'Ko tones are marked as diacritics, in a similar manner to the marking of some vowels in Arabic.

History

Kante created N'Ko in response to erroneous beliefs that no indigenous African writing system existed, as well as to provide a better way to write Mandé languages, which had for centuries been written in predominately in Ajami script, which was not perfectly suited to the tones unique to Mandé and common to many West African languages. A widely told story among N'Ko proponents is that Kante was particularly challenged to create a distinct system when he, in Bouake, stumbled upon a book by a Lebanese author who dismissively equated African languages "like those of the birds, impossible to transcribe" despite said Ajami history. Kante devised N'Ko as he was in Bingerville, Côte d'Ivoire and later brought to Kante's natal region of Kankan, Guinea.

N'Ko began to be used in many educational books when the script is believed to have been finalized on April 14, 1949 (now N'Ko Alphabet Day); Kante had transcribed from religious to scientific and philosophical literature, even a dictionary. These materials were given as gifts into other Mandé-speaking parts of West Africa. The script received its first specially made typewriter from Eastern Europe back when Guinea had ties with the Soviet Union in the 1950s.

The introduction of the script led to a movement promoting literacy in the N'Ko script among Mandé speakers in both Anglophone and Francophone West Africa. N'Ko literacy was instrumental in shaping the Maninka cultural identity in Guinea, and it has also strengthened the Mandé identity in other parts of West Africa.

Current use

As of 2005, it was used mainly in Guinea and the Ivory Coast (respectively by Maninka and Dyula speakers), with an active user community in Mali (by Bambara speakers). Publications include a translation of the Quran, a variety of textbooks on subjects such as physics and geography, poetic and philosophical works, descriptions of traditional medicine, a dictionary, and several local newspapers. Though taught mostly informally through N'ko literacy promotion associations, N'ko has also been introduced more recently into formal education through private primary schools in Upper Guinea.  It has been classed as the most successful of the West African scripts.

N'Ko literature generally uses a literary language register, termed kangbe (literally, 'clear language'), that is seen as a potential compromise dialect across Mandé languages. For example, the word for 'name' in Bamanan is tɔgɔ and in Maninka it is tɔɔ. N'Ko has only one written word for 'name', but individuals read and pronounce the word in their own language. This literary register is thus intended as a koiné language blending elements of the principal Mandé languages, which are mutually intelligible, but has a very strong Maninka influence.

There has also been documented use of N'Ko, with additional diacritics, for traditional religious publications in the Yoruba and Fon languages of Benin and southwestern Nigeria.

Letters
The N'Ko script is written from right to left, with letters being connected to one another.

Vowels

Consonants

Tones
N'Ko uses 7 diacritical marks to denote tonality and vowel length. Together with plain vowels, N'Ko distinguishes four tones: high, low, ascending, and descending; and two vowel lengths: long and short. Unmarked signs designate short, descending vowels.

Numbers

Non-native sounds and letters

N'Ko also provides a way of representing non-native sounds through the modification of its letters with diacritics. These letters are used in transliterated names and loanwords.

Two dots above a vowel, resembling a diaeresis or umlaut mark, represent a foreign vowel: u-two-dots for the French /y/ sound, or e-two-dots for the French /ə/.

Diacritics are also placed above some consonant letters to cover sounds not found in Mandé, such as gb-dot for /g/; gb-line for /ɣ/; gb-two-dots for /k͡p/; f-dot for /v/; rr-dot for /ʁ/; etc.

Digitization
With the increasing use of computers and the subsequent desire to provide universal access to information technology, the challenge arose of developing ways to use the N'Ko script on computers. From the 1990s onwards, there were efforts to develop fonts and even web content by adapting other software and fonts. A DOS word processor named Koma Kuda was developed by Prof. Baba Mamadi Diané from Cairo University. However the lack of intercompatibility inherent in such solutions was a block to further development.

Wikipedia
There is also a N’ko version of Wikipedia in existence since 26 November 2019, it contains 975 articles as of 16 August 2021, with 7,880 edits and 2,018 users.

Unicode

N'Ko script was added to the Unicode Standard in July 2006 with the release of version 5.0. Additional characters were added in 2018.

UNESCO's Programme Initiative B@bel supported preparing a proposal to encode N'Ko in Unicode. In 2004, the proposal, presented by three professors of N'Ko (Baba Mamadi Diané, Mamady Doumbouya, and Karamo Kaba Jammeh) working with Michael Everson, was approved for balloting by the ISO working group WG2. In 2006, N'Ko was approved for Unicode 5.0. The Unicode block for N'Ko is U+07C0–U+07FF:

References

General sources 
 Condé, Ibrahima Sory 2. Soulemana Kanté entre Linguistique et Grammaire : Le cas de la langue littéraire utilisée dans les textes en N'Ko  (in French)
 Conrad, David C. (2001). Reconstructing Oral Tradition: Souleymane Kanté's Approach to Writing Mande History. Mande Studies 3, 147–200.
 Dalby, David (1969) 'Further indigenous scripts of West Africa: Mandin, Wolof and Fula alphabets and Yoruba 'Holy' writing', African Language Studies, 10, pp. 161–181.
 Davydov, Artem. On Souleymane Kanté's "Nko Grammar" 
 Everson, Michael, Mamady Doumbouya, Baba Mamadi Diané, & Karamo Jammeh. 2004. Proposal to add the N'Ko script to the BMP of the UCS Donaldson, Coleman (2017) Clear Language: Script, Register and the N'ko Movement of Mandé-Speaking West Africa. Doctoral Dissertation, Philadelphia, PA: University of Pennsylvania.
 
 Donaldson, Coleman (2017) "Orthography, Standardization and Register: The Case of Mandé." In Standardizing Minority Languages: Competing Ideologies of Authority and Authenticity in the Global Periphery, edited by Pia Lane, James Costa, and Haley De Korne, 175–199. Routledge Critical Studies in Multilingualism. New York, NY: Routledge.
 
 Oyler, Dianne White (1994) Mande identity through literacy, the N'ko writing system as an agent of cultural nationalism. Toronto : African Studies Association.
 Oyler, Dianne (1995). For "All Those Who Say N'ko": N'ko Literacy and Mande Cultural Nationalism in the Republic of Guinea. Unpublished PhD dissertation, University of Florida.
 Oyler, Dianne White (1997) 'The N'ko alphabet as a vehicle of indigenist historiography', History in Africa, 24, pp. 239–256.
 Rovenchak, Andrij. (2015) Quantitative Studies in the Corpus of Nko Periodicals, Recent Contributions to Quantitative Linguistics, Arjuna Tuzzi, Martina Benešová, Ján Macutek (eds.), 125–138. Berlin: Walter de Gruyter.
 Singler, John Victor (1996) 'Scripts of West Africa', in Daniels, Peter T., & Bright, William (eds) The World's Writing Systems, New York, NY: Oxford University Press, Inc. pp. 593–598.
Vydrine, Valentin F. (2001) 'Souleymane Kanté, un philosophe-innovateur traditionnaliste maninka vu à travers ses écrits en nko', Mande Studies, 3, pp. 99–131.
 Wyrod, Christopher. 2003. The light on the horizon: N'Ko literacy and formal schooling in Guinea. MA thesis, George Washington University.
 Wyrod, Christopher. 2008. A social orthography of identity: the N'Ko literacy movement in West Africa. International Journal of the Sociology of Language 192:27–44.
 B@bel and Script Encoding Initiative Supporting Linguistic Diversity in Cyberspace 12-11-2004 (UNESCO)

External links

N'Ko Institute
Kanjamadi
Observations on the use of N'ko
Omniglot page on N'ko, with more links
Nkohome, N'ko tutorial site with information on N'ko publications and contacts
Virtual N'Ko keyboard by KeymanWeb
 How to write the N'ko alphabet (ߒߞߏ) of West Africa: A tutorial!, tutorial video on writing basic letters from An Ka Taa, an online Mandé language resource
Information about Mandé languages
An introduction to N'Ko
"Casablanca Statement" (on localization of ICT) translated & written in N'Ko
PanAfriL10n page on N'Ko
Translation of the Meaning of the Holy Quran in N'ko
Everyone Speaks Text Message (Tina Rosenberg, The New York Times Magazine'', Dec. 11, 2011)

Alphabets
Scripts with ISO 15924 four-letter codes
Writing systems introduced in 1949
Writing systems of Africa
Right-to-left writing systems
Constructed scripts